A savings bond is a government bond designed to provide funds for the issuer while also providing a relatively safe investment for the purchaser to save money, typically a retail investor. The earliest savings bonds were the war bond programs of World War II. Examples of savings bonds include:

Canada Savings Bond
Ontario Savings Bond
Saskatchewan Savings Bond
Japanese Government Bonds for Retail Investors
United States Savings Bonds

Bonds (finance)